The Tedzami is a river of Georgia. It is a right tributary of the Kura (Mtkvari), which it joins west of the town Kaspi.

References

Rivers of Georgia (country)